A wiring cupboard is a small room commonly found in institutional buildings, such as schools and offices, where electrical connections are made.  While they are used  for many purposes, their most common use is for computer networking where it may be called a premises wire distribution room (PWD room). Many types of network connections place limits on the distance between end user equipment, such as personal computers, and network access devices, such as routers. These restrictions might require multiple wiring cupboards on each floor of a large building.

Equipment that may be found in a wiring closet includes:

Alarm systems
Circuit breaker panels
Video systems, such as cable TV and closed-circuit television systems
Ethernet routers, Network switches, Firewalls
Fiber optic terminations
Patch panels
Telephone punch blocks
Wireless access points

See also
 Equipment room
 On-premises wiring

Electrical wiring
Networking hardware
Rooms